The Angiosperm Phylogeny Website (or APweb) is a website dedicated to research on angiosperm phylogeny and taxonomy.

The site is hosted by the Missouri Botanical Garden website and maintained by researchers,  Peter F. Stevens and Hilary M. Davis. Peter F. Stevens is a member of the Angiosperm Phylogeny Group (APG). The taxonomy presented is broadly based on the work of the APG, with modifications to incorporate new results.

References

External links

 , hosted by the Missouri Botanical Garden

Plant taxonomy
American science websites
Angiosperm taxonomy
Angiosperm Phylogeny Group
Online taxonomy databases
Missouri Botanical Garden